WUSA or wusa may refer to:

 Women's United Soccer Association (defunct), the world's first women's professional association football league, based in the United States
 WUSA (film), a 1970 drama film
 WUSA (TV), a television station (channel 9 digital) broadcasting in Washington, D.C., United States
 WMTX, a radio station (100.7 FM) licensed to Tampa, Florida, United States, which used the call sign WUSA-FM from June 1986 to December 1996
 KARE (TV), a television station (channel 11 digital) licensed to Minneapolis, Minnesota, United States, which used the call sign WUSA from July 1985 to June 1986
 Wollongong Undergraduate Students' Association, the elected student representative organisation, for undergraduate students, at the University of Wollongong, Australia
 The Windows Update Agent (wusa.exe)